Arthur Soames may refer to:

 Christopher Soames (Arthur Christopher John Soames, 1920–1987), British Conservative  politician
 Arthur Wellesley Soames (1852–1934), British Liberal politician and architect
 Arthur Granville Soames (1886–1962), member of HM's Coldstream Guards